The Orange Spring Tournament was an early men's open tennis tournament held in South Orange, New Jersey, United States. It was usually staged  the second week of June annually from 1882 to 1899.

History
The Orange Spring Tournament was a brief pre-open era tennis tournament was played on outdoor grass courts in Montrose, South Orange, New Jersey, United States, there were eight editions of this event.

Past tournaments
Incomplete list of tournaments included:

Men's singles

See also
 Orange LTC Open
 Orange Invitational

Notes

References
Citations

Sources
Hall, Valentine G[ill (1889). Lawn tennis in America. Biographical sketches of all the prominent players ... knotty points, and all the latest rules and directions governing handicaps, umpires, and rules for playing. New York, USA: New York, D. W. Granbery & co.
 Tournament – "Orange Spring Tournament". www.tennisarchives.com. TA. 2017.

Defunct tennis tournaments in the United States
Grass court tennis tournaments
South Orange, New Jersey
Tennis tournaments in New Jersey